San Andrés Totoltepec is a community in Tlalpan Delegacion, Federal District, Mexico.

Peterson Schools has its Tlalpan campus in San Andrés Totoltepec.

References

Tlalpan